Egil Ly (born 31 October 1938) is a Norwegian retired sailor.

He represented the Royal Norwegian Yacht Club and competed in the 1964 Summer Olympics. In the mixed three person keelboat class as a crew member under Morits Skaugen.

He was born in Oslo, and resides in Rykkinn.

References

1938 births
Living people
Norwegian male sailors (sport)
Olympic sailors of Norway
Sailors at the 1964 Summer Olympics – Dragon
Sportspeople from Bærum